Sergey Mikhnovets (born 11 January 1972) is a Belarusian swimmer. He competed in the men's 1500 metre freestyle event at the 1996 Summer Olympics.

References

1972 births
Living people
Belarusian male freestyle swimmers
Olympic swimmers of Belarus
Swimmers at the 1996 Summer Olympics